Albanian rapper Noizy has released five studio albums, three mixtapes and numerous singles as a lead artist and featured artist.

Albums

Studio albums

Mixtapes

Singles

As lead artist

2000s

2010s

2020s

As featured artist

References 

Discographies of Albanian artists